Industrial Party may refer to:

 Prompartiya ("Industrial Party"), an allegedly anti-Soviet organization during the Industrial Party Affair.
 Industrial Party (China), a term refers to a group of Chinese thinkers and Chinese people who support scientific thinking, advanced technology, techno-nationalism and economic growth, but reject liberalism, universal values and free market. Also a fan culture.

See also 
 Technocracy movement